Qaleh Now (also Romanized as Qal`eh Now; also known as Yengī Qal‘eh) is a village in Zavin Rural District, Zavin District, Kalat County, Razavi Khorasan Province, Iran. At the 2006 census, its population was 1,168, in 312 families.

References 

Populated places in Kalat County